Alok Nath (born 10 July 1956) is an Indian actor known for his work in Hindi cinema and television. He made his film debut with the 1982 English (and Hindi) film Gandhi, directed by Sir Richard Attenborough, which won an Oscar Academy Award for Best Picture that year. He appeared in the soap opera, Buniyaad, which took the country by storm in 1986. He was also in Rishtey, which aired from 1999 to 2001. He appeared in Star Plus serials like Sapna Babul Ka...Bidaai, Yahaaan Main Ghar Ghar Kheli and Yeh Rishta Kya Kehlata Hai. Nath was born in  Khagaria (Bihar) on 10 July 1956. Nath has a sister, Vineeta Malik, she is known for the portrayal of the character Bhairavi in the television series Yeh Rishta Kya Kehlata Hai.

In December 2013, jokes and memes based on characters played by Alok Nath started trending on social media and spread quickly. The Curious Case of Alok Nath - Why did Alok Nath Trend on Twitter, a case-study to analyze the content which led to the interest in Nath, became popular on 4 January 2014. Reacting to the jokes, the actor admitted that he liked most of them.

Nath was accused of rape by writer-producer Vinda Nanda and sexual misconduct by multiple women during the Indian Me Too movement in 2018 and he was charged with rape by the Mumbai Police.

Filmography

Film

Television

Controversies

In October 2018, amidst India's Me too movement, Alok Nath was accused of rape by TV producer Vinta Nanda who worked with him in the TV show Tara in the mid-90s. Alok Nath denied the allegation. Subsequently, actresses Renuka Shahane, Himani Shivpuri, Sandhya Mridul, Deepika Amin, and an anonymous Hum Saath-Saath Hain crew member have either admitted to knowing about Nath's predatory behaviour or written about instances where they themselves have been assaulted by him.

On 15 October 2018, Nath sued Nanda for defamation, asking for a written apology and Re 1 as compensation. He has filed the case jointly with his wife Ashu Nath.

On 17 October 2018, Nanda registered a complaint against Nath in Mumbai Oshiwara Police Station.

On 1 March 2019, Mumbai Mirror reported that Alok Nath portrayed a judge in a movie based on the Me Too movement.

On 11 August 2019, India Today reported that rape case against Alok Nath by Vinta Nanda has been closed due to lack of evidence.

References

External links
 
 Interview with Alok Nath at Bollywoodgate.com
 

1956 births
Living people
Male actors from Bihar
Indian male film actors
20th-century Indian male actors
Indian male voice actors
Male actors in Hindi cinema
Indian male television actors
Indian male soap opera actors
21st-century Indian male actors
People from Khagaria district